The 1970 Monte Carlo Open was a combined men's and women's tennis tournament played on outdoor clay courts at the Monte Carlo Country Club in Roquebrune-Cap-Martin, France. The  tournament was independent, i.e. not part of the 1970 Pepsi-Cola Grand Prix or 1970 World Championship Tennis circuit. It was the 64th edition of the event and was held from 13 April through 19 April 1970. Željko Franulović and Helga Niessen won the singles titles.

Finals

Men's singles
 Željko Franulović defeated  Manuel Orantes 6–4, 6–3, 6–3

Women's singles
 Helga Niessen defeated  Kerry Melville 6–4, 6–1

Men's doubles
 Marty Riessen /  Roger Taylor defeated  Pierre Barthès /  Nikola Pilić 6–3, 6–4, 6–2

Women's doubles
 Gail Chanfreau /  Françoise Dürr defeated  Winnie Shaw /  Virginia Wade  6–2, 6–3

References

External links
 
 Association of Tennis Professionals (ATP) tournament profile
 ITF tournament details

Monte-Carlo Masters
Monte Carlo Open
Monte Carlo Open
Monte
Monte Carlo Open